Jönköping Bandy IF is a bandy club in Jönköping, Sweden. The club was founded as Norrby IK in 1947, and was then a club for association football. The club changed names to Järhaga SK in 1949 and started playing bandy in 1963. While the bandy team thrived, the football club struggled and was ultimately dissolved in the 1980s. In mid 2005, the club changed to the present name, to better highlight its hometown.

The club has played in Allsvenskan, the second tier league of Swedish bandy, for many years in a row.

References

External links
 http://www.laget.se/JBIF

Bandy clubs in Sweden
Bandy clubs established in 1947
1947 establishments in Sweden
Sport in Jönköping